Colfe  may refer to:

 Colfe's School, Greenwich, England

People with the surname
 Abraham Colfe (died 1657), English vicar
 Isaac Colfe (died 1597), English divine

See also
 Colfer, a surname